Moussa Sangare (born 21 February 2002) is an Ivorian footballer who plays for Železiarne Podbrezová as a left winger.

Club career

FK Železiarne Podbrezová
Sangare made his professional debut for Železiarne Podbrezová against MŠK Žilina on 19 February 2023. Sangare came on in the 62nd minute as a substitute for Šimon Faško and in the 79th minute he netted a winning goal.

References

External links
 FK Železiarne Podbrezová official club profile 
 
 Futbalnet profile 
 

2002 births
Living people
Ivorian footballers
Association football forwards
FC Nordsjælland players
FK Kauno Žalgiris players
Næstved Boldklub players
FK Železiarne Podbrezová players
Danish 1st Division players
A Lyga players
Slovak Super Liga players
Ivorian expatriate footballers
Ivorian expatriate sportspeople in Denmark
Expatriate footballers in Denmark
Ivorian expatriate sportspeople in Lithuania
Expatriate footballers in Lithuania
Ivorian expatriate sportspeople in Slovakia
Expatriate footballers in Slovakia